Sir Eric Bourne Bentinck Speed, KCB, KBE, MC (26 January 1895 – 28 June 1971) was a British civil servant. He was Permanent Under-Secretary of State for War, jointly with Sir Frederick Bovenschen from 1942 to 1945, and then until 1948.

References 

 https://www.ukwhoswho.com/view/10.1093/ww/9780199540891.001.0001/ww-9780199540884-e-159782

1895 births
1971 deaths
Permanent Under-Secretaries of State for War
Knights Commander of the Order of the Bath
Knights Commander of the Order of the British Empire
Recipients of the Military Cross
People educated at Christ's Hospital
King's Own Yorkshire Light Infantry officers
British Army personnel of World War I
Recipients of the Croix de Guerre 1914–1918 (France)
Civil servants in the War Office
Civil servants in HM Treasury
Private secretaries in the British Civil Service